is a mountain at an altitude of 1,588 m on the border between Yamanashi and Kanagawa Prefectures in the northern part of the Tanzawa Mountains. It used to be called "Omureyama". It is counted as one of the 100 famous mountains in Yamanashi, and the Kanagawa side is designated as Tanzawa-Ōyama National Monument.

References

Mountains of Kanagawa Prefecture
Mountains of Yamanashi Prefecture
One-thousanders of Asia